Wa or WA may refer to:

Print media
 Wa, a fictional country in Kara-Tur of the Forgotten Realms universe
 Weimarer Ausgabe, Weimar edition of Martin Luther's works
 The Wine Advocate, a bimonthly wine publication based in the US

Businesses and organizations
 Weerbaarheidsafdeling, a paramilitary force associated with the Dutch National Socialist Movement
 Western Airlines (IATA airline designator WA) (defunct)
 Western Arms, a Japan-based airsoft manufacturer
 "World Archery", brand name of the World Archery Federation
 KLM Cityhopper (IATA airline designator WA)

Language
 Wa (Javanese) (ꦮ), a letter in the Javanese script
 Wa (kana), romanisation of the Japanese kana わ and ワ
 Wa language, a group of languages spoken by the Wa people
 Walloon language (ISO 639 language code wa)

Places

Asia
 Wa (Japan) (倭), an old Chinese name for Japan
 Wa Land, the natural and historical region inhabited mainly by the Wa people in Myanmar and China
 Wa Self-Administered Division, a current administrative division in Myanmar
 Wa State, a de facto independent state in Myanmar

Elsewhere 
 WA postcode area in north west England
 Wa, Ghana, a city in northern Ghana
 Roman Catholic Diocese of Wa, Ghana
 Washington (state), US, standard abbreviation
 State of Western Australia

Schools
 Westford Academy, a public high school in Westford, Massachusetts, United States
 Woodstock Academy, a public high school in Woodstock, Connecticut, United States
 Worcester Academy, a private high school in Worcester, Massachusetts, United States

Technology
 wa (watercraft), outrigger proa of the Caroline Islands
 Write amplification

Other uses
 Nüwa or Wa, a Chinese goddess (媧)
 Wa (Japanese culture) (和), a Japanese social construct
 , pronounced wa, used in conversation to mark a change in topic 
 Wa (unit), a Thai unit of measurement
 Wa people (佤), an ethnic group in China and Myanmar
 Wing attack, one of the positions in netball

Language and nationality disambiguation pages